Adeliza or Adelida (died before 1113) was a daughter of William the Conqueror and his wife, Matilda of Flanders. There is considerable uncertainty about her life, including her dates of birth and death. In a mortuary roll prepared at her sister's religious house, she was listed first among the daughters of William the Conqueror. She was usually the first daughter in lists of William's children, and thus probably the eldest. Her inclusion in the mortuary roll indicates that her death preceded the date of its 1113 compilation.

Biography
In the additions Orderic Vitalis made to the Gesta Normannorum Ducum (Deeds of the Norman Dukes), he states that prior to his death at the Battle of Hastings, Harold Godwinson was betrothed to "Adelidis", a daughter of William, and that she remained single after his death. Calling her "Adelida", Robert of Torigni follows Orderic in showing her as the affianced of Harold.

However, in the later books of his Historia Ecclesiastica, Orderic instead states that Adeliza was "a virgin under the protection of Roger de Beaumont" which, in the view of historian Elisabeth van Houts, probably means that she was a nun of St Léger at Préaux. Orderic makes a previously unknown sister Agatha the fiancée of Harold, and also of Alfonso VI of León and Castile.

She was almost certainly the Adeliza addressed by Archbishop Anselm of Canterbury in prayers and meditations as a "venerable lady of royal nobility".

References

References

Date of birth unknown
Date of death unknown
Year of birth unknown
Year of death uncertain
English princesses
House of Normandy
11th-century English people
11th-century English women
12th-century English women
12th-century English people
Children of William the Conqueror
Daughters of kings